‌The 2021 Asian Club League Handball Championship was 23rd edition of the championship held from 12 to 21 June 2021 at Jeddah, Saudi Arabia under the aegis of Asian Handball Federation (AHF). It was the third time in history that the championship was organised by the Saudi Arabian Handball Federation. It also acted as the qualification tournament for the 2021 IHF Men's Super Globe, with top team from the championship directly qualifying for the event to be held also in Jeddah, Saudi Arabia.
Al-Duhail SC won the final 27–24 against Al-Kuwait SC for their second Asian Club League title.

Draw
The draw ceremony took place on 2 May 2021 at the King Abdullah Sports City, Jeddah, Saudi Arabia at 10:30 hrs. (local time).

The ceremony was attended by the IHF Vice-President and AHF Treasurer Bader Al-Theyab, AHF Executive Director Dr. Ahmed Abu Al-Lail Al-Failakawi and the representatives of the participating clubs. The draw results are as follows:

Referees 
The following referee pairs were selected by the AHF Playing Rules and Referees Commission in co-ordination with the AHF Executive Committee.

Preliminary round
All times are local (UTC+3).

Group A

Group B

Knockout stage

Bracket

Ninth place game

Seventh place game

Fifth place game

Semifinals

Third place game

Final

Final standings

Statistics

Top scorers

Top goalkeepers

References

External links
 Tournament Website
 AHF Website

International handball competitions hosted by Saudi Arabia
Handball competitions in Asia
Asian Handball Championships
Asian Men's Club League Handball Championship, 2020
Asia
Asian Men's Club League Handball Championship
Asian Club League Handball
Asian Men's Club League Handball Championship
Handball in Saudi Arabia
Asian Men's Club League Handball Championship